Alexandre Durimel (born 16 March 1990) is a French professional footballer who plays as a centre-back for Championnat National 3 club Stade Poitevin.

References

External links
Player Profile at SO Foot

1990 births
Footballers from Paris
Living people
French footballers
Association football defenders
Amiens SC players
CS Turnu Severin players
FC Dinamo București players
CA Bastia players
CS Sedan Ardennes players
FC Chambly Oise players
FC Bastia-Borgo players
Gazélec Ajaccio players
Andrézieux-Bouthéon FC players
Stade Poitevin FC players
Ligue 2 players
Liga I players
Championnat National players
Championnat National 2 players
Championnat National 3 players
French expatriate footballers
Expatriate footballers in Romania
French expatriate sportspeople in Romania